Heinrich Christian Funck (22 November 1771 – 14 April 1839) was a German pharmacist and bryologist born in Wunsiedel, Bavaria. He was a co-founder of the Regensburg Botanical Society.

He received early training at a pharmacy in Regensburg, subsequently studying in Salzburg, Erlangen and Jena. In 1803 he acquired the family-owned pharmacy in Gefrees, from where he performed research of cryptogams, especially bryophytes. He conducted botanical investigations in the nearby Fichtelgebirge, and also organized excursions to the Salzburg Alps, Italy, Switzerland, et al.

In 1834 he sold the pharmacy in Gefrees in order to devote more time and energy to botany. Funck died of a stroke in Gefrees on 14 April 1839.

Written works 
 Kryptogamische Gewächse des Fichtelgebirges, Leipzig; exsiccata work, second edition 1806–1838, 42 fascicles) – Cryptogamic plants of the Fichtelgebirge.
 Deutschlands Moose: Ein Taschenherbarium zum Gebrauch auf botanischen Excursionen, Bayreuth (1820) – Mosses of Germany : a pocket herbarium for use on botanical excursions.

References 
 Museum Grenoble (translated biography)
 Phaneros and Pteridophytes (F) Collectors Index Herbarium M (translated biography)

1771 births
1839 deaths
People from Wunsiedel
19th-century German botanists
Bryologists
German pharmacists
Scientists from Regensburg